Mahfuza Rahman Rina is a Bangladesh Awami League politician and the former Member of Bangladesh Parliament from a reserved seat.

Career
Rina was elected to parliament from reserved seat as a Bangladesh Awami League candidate in 2009.

References

Awami League politicians
Living people
Women members of the Jatiya Sangsad
9th Jatiya Sangsad members
21st-century Bangladeshi women politicians
21st-century Bangladeshi politicians
Year of birth missing (living people)